Electronic Arts is an American company that is a developer, marketer, publisher, and distributor of video games, that was founded in 1982. Products of the company include EA Sports franchises, Sims, and other titles on both handheld and home gaming consoles.

Electronic Arts often acquires new companies to expand or add to new product lines. For instance, EA chairman and chief executive officer Larry Probst said after the acquisition of JAMDAT Mobile that "we intend to build a leading global position in the [...] business of providing games on mobile phones". EA followed through with this later, making the company into EA Mobile, and allowing people to purchase and download content produced by them directly onto their phones. After the acquisition of Origin Systems, some staff in that company claimed that Electronic Arts initially gave them more resources, but allowed little latitude if employees made a mistake, and in some cases no longer trusted them, and even worked against them. EA has shut down entire companies or the studios thereof after acquiring them, including  the studio DICE Canada, Origin Systems, EA Chicago (NuFX), and Pandemic Studios. Gaming blogger Brian Crecente has said that fears that EA doesn't care about the quality of their products after they are acquired are debatable.

As of April 2021, Electronic Arts' largest acquisition is the purchase of Glu Mobile, for $2.4 billion. Of the 39 companies acquired by EA, 20 are based in the U.S., five in the United Kingdom, six in Continental Europe, and eight elsewhere. The majority of these companies and studios are now defunct, with some having been merged into other entities. Of the six companies which EA purchased a stake in, two remaining companies are based in the U.S., while three other U.S. companies are defunct. After acquiring a 19.9% stake in France-based Ubisoft in 2004, EA sold a remaining 14.8% stake in it in 2010.

Each acquisition listed is for the entire company, unless otherwise noted. The acquisition date listed is the date of the agreement between Electronic Arts (EA) and the subject of the acquisition. Unless otherwise noted, the value of each acquisition is listed in U.S. dollars, because EA is headquartered in the U.S. If the value of the acquisition is not listed, then it is undisclosed. If the EA service that is derived from the acquired company is known, then it is also listed. According to data from Pitch Book via VentureBeat, the company has spent about $2.9 Billion on its 10 biggest acquisitions since 1992.


Key

Acquisitions

Total:  companies

Stakes

Notes

References

External links
Electronic Arts' official website

Electronic Arts
Acquisitions